Raúl Sánchez Díaz Martell (15 April 1915 – 17 April 2011) was the Governor of Baja California from 1965 to 1971. He died in Mexicali.

References

External links
Baja Governor profiles 

1915 births
2011 deaths
Governors of Baja California
Institutional Revolutionary Party politicians
National Autonomous University of Mexico alumni
Politicians from Guadalajara, Jalisco
People from Mexicali
20th-century Mexican politicians